The history of cricket in the West Indies is covered in the following articles:

History of cricket in the West Indies to 1918
History of cricket in the West Indies from 1918–19 to 1945
History of cricket in the West Indies from 1945–46 to 1970
History of cricket in the West Indies from 1970–71 to 1980
History of cricket in the West Indies from 1980–81 to 1990
History of cricket in the West Indies from 1990–91 to 2000
History of cricket in the West Indies from 2000–01

 Caribbean
History of cricket in the West Indies